Dorothea Sharp  (1874 – 17 December 1955) was a British artist best known for her landscapes and naturalistic studies of children at play.

Life and career 

Sharp was born in Dartford, Kent, and began her training aged 21, when, after inheriting £100 from an uncle, she attended the Richmond art school run by C. E. Johnson RI. She went on to study at the Regent Street Polytechnic, where her work was admired by George Clausen and David Murray. She went on to Paris, where she first encountered the work of the Impressionists – in particular Claude Monet – that was to have a profound and lasting effect on her art, resulting in the highly impressionistic and spontaneous style that she was to adopt for the rest of her life.

In 1903 she became an Associate of the Society of Women Artists, and in 1908 a full member, going on to serve as vice-president for 4 years. She was elected a member of the Royal Society of British Artists in 1907 and the Royal Institute of Oil Painters in 1922. Sharp exhibited at The Royal Academy from 1901–1948 and held her first one-woman show at the Connell Gallery in 1933; this was a great success and she was described as ‘one of England’s greatest living woman painters’ by Harold Sawkins, editor of The Artist.
Throughout the 1920s and 1930s Sharp travelled to Europe (e.g. Cassis) to paint, and also to Bosham and St Ives, Cornwall, where she met fellow artist Marcella Smith, who became a lifelong friend. Sharp was made an honorary member of the St. Ives Society of Artists (STISA) in 1928.

Sharp died on 17 December 1955, aged 81.

References

Further reading

External links 
 

1874 births
1955 deaths
19th-century English painters
20th-century English painters
19th-century English women artists
20th-century English women artists
Alumni of the Regent Street Polytechnic
English women painters
People from Bosham
People from Dartford
People from St Ives, Cornwall